USS LST-717 was a  in the United States Navy during World War II. She was transferred to the Republic of China Navy as ROCS Chung Yeh.

Construction and commissioning 
LST-717 was laid down on 20 June 1944 at Jeffersonville Boat and Machine Company, Jeffersonville, Indiana. Launched on 29 July 1944 and commissioned on 23 August 1944.

Service in United States Navy 
During World War II, LST-717 was assigned to the Asiatic-Pacific theater. She then participated in the Palawan Island landings from 1 to 7 March 1945 and Mindanao Island landings from 17 to 23 April 1945. She was assigned to occupation and China from 2 September 1945 to 12 June 1946.

She was decommissioned on 12 June 1946 and was struck from the Naval Register on 12 March 1946. On 12 June 1946, she was then transferred to the Republic of China under the lend-lease program and renamed Chung Yeh.

Service in Republic of China Navy 
On 13 November 1947, she was stranded on the Changshan Island.

She was then incorporated into People's Liberation Army Navy in 1953 after her repair.

Awards 
LST-717 have earned the following awards:

 American Campaign Medal
 Asiatic-Pacific Campaign Medal (1 battle star)
 World War II Victory Medal
 Navy Occupation Service Medal (with Asia clasp)
 Philippine Presidential Unit Citation
 Philippine Liberation Medal (1 battle star)

Citations

Sources 
 
 
 
 

LST-542-class tank landing ships
Ships built in Jeffersonville, Indiana
World War II amphibious warfare vessels of the United States
LST-542-class tank landing ships of the Republic of China Navy
1944 ships